Bury Bank is an Iron Age hillfort in Staffordshire, England, about  north-west of Stone and near the village of Meaford. It is a scheduled monument.

It is thought that Wulfhere, King of Mercia during the 7th century, lived at this site, known as Wulfherecester.

Description
The defences follow the contours of a small hill. It was excavated in 1892, and was found to consist of earth and stones.

The outer rampart survives in places, up to height  internally and  externally. There is an inturned entrance at the north-west. No evidence of structures is visible in the interior, but they may exist below the surface.

No evidence has been found that the fort was re-used around the time of Wulfhere.

There are two barrows in the south of the interior: the southernmost has height  and diameter ; adjacent, to the north-west, is the second barrow, height  and diameter .

See also
 Hillforts in Britain

References

Hill forts in Staffordshire
Scheduled monuments in Staffordshire
Borough of Stafford